Romine is a surname. Notable people with the surname include:

Al Romine (1930–2015), American football player
Andrew Romine (born 1985), American baseball player
Austin Romine (born 1988), American baseball player
Gary Romine, American politician
Kevin Romine (born 1961), American baseball player
William Romine (born 1944), American politician